Vince Smith (Vincent Stuart Smith) is a British entomologist and biodiversity informatician at the Natural History Museum, London.

Education and career 
Smith completed a bachelor's degree at the University of Bristol before completing a PhD at the University of Glasgow specialising on parasitic lice (Phthiraptera). He went on to research host-parasite evolution at the University of Glasgow and then the Illinois Natural History Survey where he helped develop the Biocorder laboratory management software. In 2006 he joined the Natural History Museum, London as a cybertaxonomist, before becoming a Research Leader in Informatics in 2012 (a position he still holds).

Smith was one of the founding editors of the Biodiversity Data Journal and has led several large EU science projects including SYNTHESYS+ and ViBRANT.

Research 
Smith's current research interest is in the field of biodiversity informatics including work relating to implementing Biodiversity Information Standards (TDWG), development of the Museum's Data Portal to make collections available online, as well as methods for digitising museum specimens. Informatics projects for the broader community include development of the Scratchpads virtual research environment and the eMonocot project.

Honours and awards 
Bicentenary Medal of the Linnean Society in 2015 
Ebbe Nielsen Prize in 2008

References

External links 
 Natural History Museum London profile

Living people
Year of birth missing (living people)
British entomologists

Alumni of the University of Bristol
Alumni of the University of Glasgow
Employees of the Natural History Museum, London